Anton Kikaš (also known as Tony, born in 1941 in Bijakovići, Bosnia-Hercegovina) is a Croatian-Canadian business man who was arrested for arms smuggling by Yugoslav authorities on 31 August 1991 during the Croatian war of independence and subsequently released in an exchange on 25 November 1991.

Early life
Kikaš was born in 1941 to ethnic Croatian parents in Bijakovići in Hercegovina, and spent his early life in Kakanj and Sarajevo. After graduating from the Faculty of Geodesy, University of Zagreb, he subsequently emigrated to Canada in 1968. In Canada he became active in the Croat community there, and in 1987 was involved in the establishment of the department of Croatian language and literature at the University of Waterloo.

Kikaš was also involved in business in Morocco, Trinidad, and Saudi Arabia, and had arranged football matches in Los Angeles.

Croatian war of independence
In 1990 Kikaš was told by Alija Izetbegović during a visit by Izetbegović to Toronto that "The sooner you Croats understand, the better it will be for you, that we Muslims have never been and will never be a part of the Croatian people." When Franjo Tuđman visited Toronto in September 1991, he passed this message on to him.

At the beginning of the Croatian war of independence he raised money from the Croatian émigré community in Canada and, with the agreement of the Croatian Ministry of the Interior, used it to purchase arms in South Africa. As Croatia was then under an arms embargo, the only in which arms could be shipped to Croatia was through illegal smuggling. He hired a Uganda Airlines Boeing 707 to ship these arms, with the plan that they would file a flight-plan to fly to Trieste, Italy and then attempt to land and unload the plane's cargo of small-arms and anti-armour weapons in Ljubljana, capital of Slovenia, which at this point had already effectively achieved de facto (but not de jure) independence from Yugoslavia after the Ten Day war. From Slovenia the arms were to be shipped to the Croatian police and National Guard. The shipment was valued at $1 million, weighed 18 tonnes, and included Singaporean SAR 80 assault rifles and ammunition. Kikaš was the only passenger on the flight, which had a crew of six.

As they approached their destination, the pilot of the aeroplane mistakenly informed Yugoslav air controllers that they were bound for Ljubljana, not Trieste. Suspicious, and since the aircraft was now headed for what was officially Yugoslav airspace, the Yugoslav authorities scrambled two Yugoslav airforce MiG 21 jets to intercept Kikaš's 707 and forced it to land at Zagreb airport.

Zagreb airport was the scene of fighting between the JNA and the Croatian police and was only partly controlled by the JNA, though the JNA successfully seized control of the aircraft upon landing. Croatian forces had attacked the control tower and blocked roads in and out of the airport. The aircraft and its contents were seized by the Yugoslavs, and Kikaš was arrested and sent to a military prison in Belgrade for interrogation after receiving a beating at the airport. After three months in prison, on 25 November 1991, Kikaš was exchanged in return for Milan Aksentijević, a Serb JNA officer captured by Croatian forces. In October 1991 Ugandan president Yoweri Museveni refused repatriation of the Uganda Airlines crew, calling them "mercenaries".

"Kikaš" the aeroplane

The Ugandan Airlines Boeing 707-328C, registration number 5X-UCM, named "Kikaš" by the Serbs, was subsequently used by them in military operations in both Croatia and Bosnia, beginning with their withdrawal from Zagreb airport under attack from the Croatian military (who they called "Zengas"). "Kikaš" was piloted out of Zagreb to Belgrade by JAT aircrew who had last flown a 707 ten years before and who flew into the airport aboard an Antonov transport and flew out aboard "Kikaš", directly over the Croatian "Zengas". "Kikaš" was subsequently used during the evacuation of the families of JNA personnel and other civilians from Bihać and Sarajevo, as well as the transport of military equipment, and was piloted by Stevan Popov.

A total of 49,000 refugees were evacuated from Sarajevo aboard "Kikaš" between 12 April and 3 May 1992 by Popov and other aircrew. JAT tried to register "Kikaš" for civilian use, but lacking technical data on the aircraft, were unsuccessful. According to an article in Politika, the aircraft was sold to a British-American company in 1996 and its subsequent fate is unknown.

Subsequent life
At the time of his arrest at Zagreb airport, Kikaš was a divorcee. Kikaš met his second wife, with whom he had two sons, shortly after being released. He now lives in Canada but regularly visits Croatia. A film entitled Nisam se bojao umrijeti ("I Am Not Afraid To Die") and directed by Jakov Sedlar was released in 2016 about his exploits.

References

1941 births
Croatian businesspeople
Croats of Bosnia and Herzegovina
Bosnia and Herzegovina emigrants to Canada
Naturalized citizens of Canada
Canadian people of Croatian descent
Canadian people of Bosnia and Herzegovina descent
People from Čitluk, Bosnia and Herzegovina
Living people